The following is a list of notable deaths in October 1991.

Entries for each day are listed alphabetically by surname. A typical entry lists information in the following sequence:
 Name, age, country of citizenship at birth, subsequent country of citizenship (if applicable), reason for notability, cause of death (if known), and reference.

October 1991

1
Willie Borsch, 61, American drag racer.
Keith Ranspot, 77, American gridiron football player.
Victor Teterin, 68, Soviet artist.
Stu Williamson, 58, American jazz musician.

2
Hazen Argue, 70, Canadian politician.
Maria Aurèlia Capmany, 73, Spanish novelist, playwright and essayist.
Patriarch Demetrios I of Constantinople, 77, Turkish archbishop, heart attack.
Lloyd Kirkham Garrison, 93, American lawyer.
Jim Handby, 88, Australian footballer and politician.
Peter Heyworth, 70, American-British music critic and biographer, stroke.

3
Max Cantor, 32, American journalist and actor (Dirty Dancing), heroin overdose.
Ed Dancker, 77, American basketball player.
Fazle Haq, 63, Pakistani general and politician, assassinated.
Paule Herreman, 72, Belgian actress and television presenter.
John Hood, 87, Australian diplomat.
Gia Nadareishvili, 70, Soviet and Georgian chess player and author on chess studies.

4
Heinrich Hellwege, 83, German politician.
Josefina Valencia Muñoz, 78, Colombian politician.
John G. Williams Jr., 67, American admiral.
J. Frank Wilson, 49, American singer, diabetes.

5
Jørgen Beck, 76, Danish actor.
Martin Ennals, 64, British human rights activist.
Ramnath Goenka, 87, Indian newspaper publisher.
Milan Milišić, 50, Yugoslav writer, shelling.
Hope Portocarrero, 62, American-Nicaraguan socialite, First Lady of Nicaragua (1967–1972, 1974–1979), cancer.

6
Elaine Burton, Baroness Burton of Coventry, 87, British politician.
Roger Forsythe, 36, American fashion designer, AIDS.
Alphonse Gallegos, 60, American Roman Catholic bishop, traffic accident.
Mark Shevelev, 86, Soviet pilot during World War II and polar aviation pioneer.
Igor Talkov, 34, Soviet singer, shot.

7
Leo Durocher, 86, American baseball player and manager.
Alan Fletcher, 84, Australian politician.
Natalia Ginzburg, 75, Italian writer and politician, cancer.
Darren Millane, 26, Australian rules football player, traffic collision.
Jorge Ángel Livraga Rizzi, 61, Argentine writer and philosopher.
Prentiss Taylor, 83, American illustrator, lithographer, and painter.

8
Ed Hanyzewski, 71, American baseball player.
Edward Skórzewski, 61, Polish film director and screenwriter.
Lyall Smith, 76, American sports writer and editor.
Zoska Veras, 99, Belarusian writer and poet.
Maria Zubreeva, 91, Soviet painter, watercolorist, and graphic artist.

9
Roy Black, 48, German schlager singer and actor, heart failure.
Dagmar Lange, 77, Swedish author of crime fiction.
Camille Libar, 73, Luxembourgian football player and manager.
Doris Lilly, 69, American newspaper columnist and writer, cancer.
Thalmus Rasulala, 51, American actor (Blacula, One Life to Live, New Jack City), heart attack.

10
Victor Christgau, 97, American politician.
Pío Cabanillas Gallas, 67, Spanish jurist and politician, heart attack.
Nickolaus Hirschl, 85, Austrian wrestler and Olympic medalist.
Yaroslav Lesiv, 46, Ukrainian poet and priest, traffic collision.
Bob Morgan, 61, American gridiron football player.
Gamble Rogers, 54, American musician, drowned.
Andrzej Zaucha, 42, Polish rhythm & blues and pop-jazz singer, and actor, shot.

11
Gene Barth, 61, American football player.
Pietro Ferraris, 79, Italian football player.
Ron Ferrier, 77, English footballer.
Redd Foxx, 68, American actor (Sanford and Son, The Redd Foxx Show, Harlem Nights), heart attack.
Luke Higgins, 70, American gridiron football player.
Clay Kirby, 43, American baseball player, heart attack.
Branislav Mihajlović, 54, Serbian football player.
Lidiya Sukharevskaya, 82, Soviet stage actress and playwright.
Carroll Williams, 74, American zoologist, lymphoma.

12
Ian Ayre, 62, Australian tennis player.
Narciso Horacio Doval, 47, Argentine football player, heart attack.
Sheila Florance, 75, Australian actress, lung cancer.
Diana Gibson, 76, American film actress.
Aline MacMahon, 92, American actress (Dragon Seed), pneumonia.
Taso Mathieson, 83, British racing driver and author of automotive history books.
Regis Toomey, 93, American actor (The Big Sleep, Guys and Dolls, Spellbound).
Grigoris Vlastos, 84, Greek scholar of ancient philosophy.

13
William Gentry, 92, New Zealand Military Forces general.
Donald Houston, 67, Welsh actor (Clash of the Titans, Where Eagles Dare, The Blue Lagoon), stroke.
Hugh Molson, Baron Molson, 88, British politician.
Daniel Oduber Quirós, 70, Costa Rican politician, president (1974–1978).
Agustín Rodríguez Sahagún, 59, Spanish politician and businessman.

14
Thomas H. Eliot, 84, American lawyer, politician, and academic.
Walter M. Elsasser, 87, German-American physicist.
Richard Hittleman, 64, American yoga teacher and author.
Jay Richard Kennedy, 80, American writer, screenwriter, composer, and record executive.
David Neville, 83, Canadian ice hockey player.

15
Antonio Canale, 76, Italian comic writer and artist.
John Greenway, 71, American folklorist and folk singer.
Verda James, 90, Canadian-American politician.
Robert Pastene, 73, American actor.
Han Ying-chieh, 64, Hong Kong actor, cancer.

16
Arthur E. Arling, 85, American cameraman and cinematographer.
Ole Beich, 36, Danish bassist (Guns N' Roses), drowned.
Lore Fischer, 80, German singer.
Giacomo Mari, 66, Italian football player.
Boris Papandopulo, 85, Croatian composer.
Barry Wong, 44, Hong Kong screenwriter, film producer and actor, heart attack.
Blago Zadro, 47, Croatian army officer, killed in action.

17
John C. Bailar, Jr., 87, American chemist and academic.
J. G. Devlin, 84, Northern Irish actor.
Tennessee Ernie Ford, 72, American singer ("Sixteen Tons", "The Shotgun Boogie"), liver failure.
Władysław Giergiel, 74, Polish football player.
Håkon Johnsen, 77, Norwegian politician.
Harlan James Smith, 67, American astronomer.
Piet van Est, 57, Dutch cyclist.

18
Enrico Boniforti, 73, Italian football player.
Stephen Dickson, 40, American baritone, complications from AIDS.
Bronisław Gosztyła, 56, Polish ice hockey player.
Judith Sulian, 71, Argentine film actress.
Gunnar Sønstevold, 78, Norwegian composer.

19
Walter Gericke, 83, German Luftwaffe officer during World War II.
Henry Holst, 92, Danish violinist.
Gheorghe Pahonțu, 58, Romanian football player.
Howard Swearer, 59, American academic, cancer.
Naum Vilenkin, 70, Soviet mathematician.

20
Georges Beuchat, 81, French inventor, businessman, and underwater diving pioneer.
Marcus Goodrich, 93, American screenwriter.
Clifford Last, 72, English sculptor.
Susan Noel, 79, English squash and tennis player.
J. Graham Parsons, 83, American diplomat.
Yehuda Tzadka, 81, Israeli rabbi and rosh yeshiva.

21
Lorenc Antoni, 82, Kosovo Albanian composer, conductor, and ethnomusicologist.
Louis Calabro, 64, Italian American orchestral composer.
Lev Chegorovsky, 77, Soviet and Russian artist.
Bobby Coombs, 83, American baseball player.
Jim Hamby, 94, American baseball player.

22
Steven "Jesse" Bernstein, 40, American writer and performance artist, suicide by exsanguination.
Robert Carlin, 90, Canadian politician.
Joy Harington, 77, English television actress, writer, producer, and director.
Hachiro Kasuga, 67, Japanese singer.
Judy Kelly, 77, Australian-British actress.

23
Derek Edge, 49, English football player.
Job Stewart, 57, British stage and screen actor.
Július Torma, 69, Czechoslovak boxer and Olympic champion.
Alida van Leeuwen, 83, Dutch diver and Olympian.

24
Ismat Chughtai, 76, Indian Urdu novelist, humanist and filmmaker.
J. A. Milton Perera, 62, Sri Lankan singer and composer.
Gene Roddenberry, 70, American television producer (Star Trek), cardiac arrest.
Vilko Ukmar, 86, Slovenian composer.
Luisa Vehil, 78, Uruguayan theater and movie actress.

25
Albert Baldauf, 73, German politician and member of the Bundestag.
George Brunet, 56, American baseball player.
Khigh Dhiegh, 81, American actor (Hawaii Five-O, The Manchurian Candidate, Seconds).
Bill Graham, 60, German-American impresario, helicopter crash.
Louis le Grange, 63, Lawyer, a South African politician.
Tamaz Namgalauri, 34, Georgian judoka and Olympian.
John Stratton, 65, British actor.
Walter Stude, 77, American field hockey player and Olympian.

26
Henry Wilson Allen, 79, American writer and screenwriter, pneumonia.
Bill Bevens, 75, American baseball player, lymphoma.
Vivian Dandridge, 70, American singer, actress and dancer, stroke.
Major Holley, 67, American jazz bassist.
Ed Justice, 78, American gridiron football player.
Enrique Sorrel, 79, Chilean football player and manager.
Tahira Tahirova, 77, Soviet politician and diplomat.

27
George Barker, 78, English poet.
Rocky Hata, 43, Japanese professional wrestler, diabetes.
Howard Kingsbury, 87, American Olympic rower (1924).
Pyke Koch, 90, Dutch artist.
Andrzej Panufnik, 77, Polish composer.

28
Sylvia Fine, 78, American lyricist, composer, and producer, emphysema.
Joseph Fletcher, 86, American professor.
John Kobal, 51, Austrian film historian, pneumonia.
Ilie Murgulescu, 89, Romanian physical chemist and a communist politician.
Akram Ojjeh, 73, Syrian-Saudi businessman, diabetes.
George Treweek, 86, Australian rugby player.
Billy Wright, 59, American singer, pulmonary embolism.

29
Cyril Black, 89, British politician.
Lee Boltin, 73, American photographer, leukemia.
Donald Churchill, 60, English actor and playwright, heart attack.
Jimmie Coker, 55, American baseball player, heart attack.
John DeCuir, Sr., 73, American art director and production designer (The King and I, Cleopatra, Hello, Dolly!), Oscar winner (1957, 1964, 1970).
Hikmat Muradov, 22, Azerbaijani soldier, killed in battle.
Nigel Poett, 84, British Army officer.
Mario Scelba, 90, Italian politician, Prime Minister (1954–1955), thrombosis.
Johan Støa, 91, Norwegian multi-sportsman and Olympian.

30
Aniela Jaffé, 88, German-Swiss psychoanalysts.
Ellis Kolchin, 75, American mathematician and academic, pancreatic cancer.
George Lambert, 72, English cricket player.
Prince Emich, 7th Prince of Leiningen, 65, German noble and entrepreneur.
Karl Freiherr Michel von Tüßling, 84, Nazi German Schutzstaffel (SS) officer and politician.

31
Gene Anderson, 52, American professional wrestler, heart attack.
Ewald Bucher, 77, German politician.
Garvin Bushell, 89, American musician and multi-instrumentalist.
Charles K.L. Davis, 66, American opera singer and musician.
Alexander Frick, 81, Liechtensteiner politician, Prime Minister (1945–1962).
Simon Gjoni, 66, Albanian conductor, and composer.
Frederick Hartt, 77, Italian Renaissance scholar and author.
Dick Joy, 75, American radio and television announcer.
Agnes Katharina Maxsein, 86, German politician and member of the Bundestag.
Joseph Papp, 70, American theatrical producer, prostate cancer.

References 

1991-10
 10